"Toxic" is a song by American rapper YG, released on August 12, 2022 as the third single from his sixth studio album I Got Issues (2022). It contains a sample of "Be Happy" by American singer Mary J. Blige. The song was produced by DJ Swish, Mike Crook, Reece Beats and Larry Jayy.

Background
YG first teased the song on social media in April 2022. On August 11, 2022, YG shared a variation of the cover artwork for the song, which shows him kneeling and kissing the pregnant stomach of social media influencer Brittany Renner.

Content
In the song, YG raps about the "ups and downs" of relationships.

Music video
The music video, released along with the single, was directed by YG and Austin Simkins. It depicts YG in a relationship with Brittany Renner, while also having a relationship with another woman whom he spends a lot of time with. YG is madly in love with the latter woman, but does not share her desire to be fully invested in their relationship. He begins to have second thoughts. The woman secretly looks through his phone and finds a picture of him kissing the belly of a pregnant Renner.

Charts

References

2022 singles
2022 songs
YG (rapper) songs
Epic Records singles
Songs written by YG (rapper)
Songs written by Mary J. Blige
Songs written by Sean Combs
Songs written by Curtis Mayfield